The Barrett–Byam Homestead is a historic house, now headquarters of the Chelmsford Historical Society, located at 40 Byam Road, Chelmsford, Massachusetts, United States. The original house dates to circa 1663, though much or all today's structure may date from the mid-18th century.

It was originally built as south-facing "saltbox" with a central chimney and fireplace in every room. The heating system appears to have been rebuilt circa 1800 with Rumford fireplaces in each room.

See also 
 List of historic houses in Massachusetts

External links 
 Barrett–Byam Homestead
 Chelmsford Historical Society

Historic house museums in Massachusetts
Museums in Middlesex County, Massachusetts
Houses in Middlesex County, Massachusetts
Chelmsford, Massachusetts